The D.V.S. Senior Honor Society is an honor society at Emory University in Atlanta. Founded in 1902, D.V.S. admits seven seniors each year based on their campus leadership, dedication to Emory, and academic excellence. It is the oldest of Emory's five secret societies. The other societies are the Paladin Society, Ducemus, Speculum, and The Order of Ammon.

Previous members of D.V.S. include Emory presidents, Board of Trustees chairs, and half of the Rhodes Scholars in Emory's history. Membership is kept secret until graduation, when the seven current members' names are printed in the Commencement announcements. The activities of the society and the meaning of its letters are not revealed publicly.

D.V.S. provides Emory with the University Mace, which is carried during Convocation and Commencement.

See also
Collegiate secret societies in North America

References
"EmoryWire", 2011
The Emory Wheel, April 19, 2005
"Emory Magazine", 1995

Collegiate secret societies
Student societies in the United States
Emory University
Student organizations established in 1902
1902 establishments in Georgia (U.S. state)